Euphorbia aprica is a species of plant in the family Euphorbiaceae. It is endemic to Madagascar.  Its natural habitats are subtropical or tropical dry forests and subtropical or tropical dry shrubland.

This common forest plant is probably a species complex, but the taxonomy is not certain.

References

Endemic flora of Madagascar
aprica
Least concern plants
Taxa named by Henri Ernest Baillon
Taxonomy articles created by Polbot